Jimmy Whitehouse may refer to:
 Jimmy Whitehouse (footballer, born 1873)
 Jimmy Whitehouse (footballer, born 1924)
 Jimmy Whitehouse (footballer, born 1934)